Joseph Schnitzer (15 June 1859 in Lauingen – 1 December 1939 in Munich) was a theologian. He started teaching at Munich University in 1902.

Literary works 
 Quellen und Forschungen zur Geschichte Savonarolas, 6 vols., 1902–1914
 Savonarola, 2 vols., 1924

References
 Friedrich Heiler: Joseph Schnitzer. Ein Vorkämpfer des deutschen Reformkatholizismus (1859–1939), 1939

External links
 
 MTA at nyitottegyetem.phil-inst.hu 

20th-century German Catholic theologians
1859 births
1939 deaths
German male non-fiction writers